Velenkosini Fiki Hlabisa (born 4 January 1965) is a South African politician and former teacher who has been President of the Inkatha Freedom Party (IFP) and the Leader of the Opposition in the KwaZulu-Natal Legislature since 2019. He served as the Secretary-General of the IFP from 2011 to 2017 and as the Mayor of the Big Five Hlabisa Local Municipality from 2016 to 2019.

Early life, education and career
Velenkosini Fiki Hlabisa was born on 4 January 1965 in Hlabisa, Northern Natal. He is the eldest of four children born to David and Thembani Hlabisa. He joined the IFP Youth Brigade at the age of thirteen in 1978 and matriculated from high school in 1983. Hlabisa then proceeded to study at the University of Zululand and the University of South Africa. His father died while he was at university in 1990. In 1991, he sought employment as a teacher and worked as one at Ngebeza High School for five years and soon as principal of Somfula High School for twenty years.

Political career
In the 1995 municipal elections, Hlabisa was elected a municipal councillor for the town of Hlabisa. He continuously served as a municipal councillor for twenty-four years, during which he was Mayor of the Big Five Hlabisa Local Municipality from 2016 to 2019. In May 2019, he was elected to the KwaZulu-Natal Legislature and given the title of Leader of the Opposition due to the IFP reclaiming the title of second-largest party in the province. Hlabisa is a member of the legislature's Finance committee.

IFP leadership 
Since joining the IFP in 1978, Hlabisa had risen through the party's leadership ranks. He was elected Secretary-General of the party in 2011. In 2017, the IFP's Extended National Council unanimously endorsed Hlabisa to succeed Mangosuthu Buthelezi as party president. Hlabisa was elected unopposed as the new leader of the IFP at the party's 35th National General Conference held in August 2019.

References

External links
Mr Velenkosini Fiki Hlabisa at People's Assembly profile
Hon. VF Hlabisa – KZN Legislature
Our President – Inkatha Freedom Party

1965 births
Living people
Zulu people
Inkatha Freedom Party politicians
Members of the KwaZulu-Natal Legislature
People from KwaZulu-Natal
University of Zululand alumni
University of South Africa alumni
Mayors of places in South Africa